Ezra Collective is a British jazz quintet composed of drummer and bandleader Femi Koleoso, bassist TJ Koleoso, keyboardist Joe Armon-Jones, trumpeter Ife Ogunjobi, and tenor saxophonist James Mollison. The group fuses elements of afrobeat, calypso, reggae, hip-hop, soul and jazz, and frequently collaborates with fellow London-based jazz musicians such as Nubya Garcia and Moses Boyd. 

The members of Ezra Collective met at the jazz programme Tomorrow's Warriors, run by Gary Crosby. The jazz group has noted that succeeding as young jazz musicians in London has had challenges, with Femi Koleoso saying that "I saw jazz music as an elite art form that I didn't have access to". He puts down the group's success as being able to freely express their musical influences from their youth. The band has said that Robert Glasper, and Kendrick Lamar's To Pimp A Butterfly provided early inspiration for their "template" as a jazz band. 

The band's 2019 instrumental single "Quest for Coin" was premiered as a "Hottest Record in The World" on Annie Mac on BBC Radio 1. In 2019, Ezra Collective released their debut LP You Can't Steal My Joy, which featured British musicians Jorja Smith and Loyle Carner. In Q4 of 2022, the band released its second LP, Where I'm Meant To Be, involving a mix of both instrumental tracks and lyrical collaborations. Critical reception was widely positive, with Kate Hutchinson from The Guardian writing that the "exceptional album could be the one to cross over to the big league".

On 3 March, 2023, it was announced that Ezra Collective would be performing at the 2023 Glastonbury Festival.

Discography

Albums 

 Chapter 7 (2016) (EP)
 Juan Pablo: The Philosopher (2018) (EP)
 You Can't Steal My Joy (2019)
 Where I'm Meant To Be (2022)

Singles 

 Samuel L Riddim (2018)
 Reason in Disguise (2018)
 Chris and Jane (2019)
 Footprints (2020)
 Dark Side Riddim (2020)
 Quest for Coin II (2020)
 More Than A Hustler (2021)
 May The Funk Be With You (2022)

Awards and nominations

References 

British jazz